Biography: The Greatest Hits is the first greatest hits compilation album by British recording artist Lisa Stansfield. Released by Arista Records on 3 February 2003, it features seventeen tracks, hits and rare songs, including: "All Around the World", "This Is the Right Time" "Change", "All Woman", "The Real Thing" and "Never, Never Gonna Give You Up". The album, which garnered positive reviews from music critics, peaked at number three in the United Kingdom and was certified Gold.

Background
In June 2001, Stansfield released Face Up, her final studio album with Arista Records. The obligatory compilation, Biography: The Greatest Hits was issued in February 2003. Four months later, Arista Records remastered all of Stansfield's studio albums and re-released them with bonus tracks. The Complete Collection box set was also issued at the same time.

Content
The European edition of Biography: The Greatest Hits includes three songs from Affection ("This Is the Right Time", "All Around the World", "Live Together"), four tracks from Real Love ("Change", "All Woman", "Time to Make You Mine", "Set Your Loving Free"), three songs from So Natural ("In All the Right Places", "So Natural", "Little Bit of Heaven"), two tracks from Lisa Stansfield ("The Real Thing", "Never, Never Gonna Give You Up") and one song from Face Up ("Let's Just Call It Love"). It also contains few non-album tracks: "People Hold On" (from Coldcut's album, What's That Noise?), "Down in the Depths" (from charity compilation, Red Hot + Blue), "Someday (I'm Coming Back)" (from The Bodyguard: Original Soundtrack Album) and "These Are the Days of Our Lives" (from charity EP, Five Live). The North American edition includes "You Can't Deny It" and "Never Gonna Fall" instead of "Little Bit of Heaven" and "Set Your Loving Free". In Europe, limited edition with bonus remix CD was also issued. Biography: The Greatest Hits was released simultaneously on DVD which includes most of Stansfield's music videos and a bonus material.

Singles
The album does not include any new recordings. Arista Records issued promotional singles with new remixes of "All Around the World" created by Norty Cotto. The single was released in the United States on 28 April 2003 and reached number thirty-four on the Billboards Hot Dance Club Songs. A remix by Junior Vasquez was also created. In 2014, these remixes of "All Around the World" were included on the deluxe 2CD + DVD re-release of Face Up (also on The Collection 1989–2003).

Critical reception

Biography: The Greatest Hits received positive reviews from music critics. Heather Phares from AllMusic gave the album 4.5 out of 5 stars and wrote that it is a must for die-hard fans and an excellent primer for casual listeners.

Commercial performance
Biography: The Greatest Hits peaked at number three on the UK Albums Chart and at number four in Italy. It also reached top forty in Belgium Flanders. The album was certified Gold in the United Kingdom. The DVD peaked at number twenty in Spain DVDs chart.

Track listing

DVD track listing
 Coldcut feat. Lisa Stansfield – People Hold On
 Lisa Stansfield – This Is The Right Time
 Lisa Stansfield – This Is The Right Time (US version)
 Lisa Stansfield – All Around The World
 Lisa Stansfield – Live Together
 Lisa Stansfield – Change
 Lisa Stansfield – All Woman
 Lisa Stansfield – Time To Make You Mine
 Lisa Stansfield – Set Your Loving Free
 Lisa Stansfield – Someday (I'm Coming Back)
 Lisa Stansfield – Down in the Depths
 Lisa Stansfield – In All The Right Places
 Lisa Stansfield – So Natural
 Lisa Stansfield – Little Bit of Heaven
 Lisa Stansfield – These Are The Days of Our Lives
 Lisa Stansfield – The Real Thing
 Lisa Stansfield – Never, Never Gonna Give You Up
 Lisa Stansfield – Let's Just Call It Love

DVD extras

Charts

Weekly charts

Year-end charts

Certifications and sales

Release history

References

2003 greatest hits albums
Lisa Stansfield compilation albums